This is a list of geolocation-based video games, also known as location-based video games. The games on this list typically run on a mobile phone using GPS for geolocation. Some games on this list also have augmented reality features.

See also 
 Gbanga, a geolocation-based social gaming platform featuring multiple games
 Curzon Memories App

References 

Geolocation-based
Location-based games
Geopositioning